Edward Bellamy (1850–1898), was an American author and socialist.

Edward Bellamy may also refer to:

Edward Bellamy (banker) (died 1749), Governor of the Bank of England and Lord Mayor of London

See also
Edward Bellamy House, Chicopee, Massachusetts
Ned Bellamy (born 1957), American actor